Gymnadenia nigra, also known as the black vanilla orchid, is a species of orchid and the provincial flower of Jämtland, a historical province of Sweden. It is a perennial species found in the major mountain ranges of Europe, including the Pyrenees and the Alps, into the Balkans and central Scandinavia, though its population has declined in the past decades due to over-harvesting. In some countries, including Italy, it is listed as an endangered species. It has a maximum height of 25 cm.

See also
 Province flowers of Sweden

References

nigra
Flora of the Alps
Jämtland